The 1947 Rawalpindi massacres (also riots) refer to widespread violence, massacres, and rapes of Sikhs and Hindus by Muslim mobs in the Rawalpindi Division of the Punjab province of British India in March 1947. The violence preceded the partition of India and was instigated and perpetrated by the Muslim League National Guards—the militant wing of the Muslim League—as well as local cadres and politicians of the League, demobilised Muslim soldiers, local officials and policemen. It followed the fall of a coalition government of the Punjab Unionists, Indian National Congress and Akali Dal, achieved through a six-week campaign by the Muslim League. The riots left between 2000-7000 Sikhs and Hindus dead, and set off their exodus from Rawalpindi Division. 80,000 Sikhs and Hindus were estimated to have left the Division by the end of April. The incidents were the first instance of partition-related ethnic cleansing in Punjab and saw rampant sexual violence, rape, and forced conversions, with many women committing mass suicides along with their children, and many killed by their male relatives, for fear of abduction and rape. The events are sometimes referred to as the Rape of Rawalpindi.

Background

In the 1946 provincial election in the Punjab, after an intensely communal campaign, the Muslim League (ML) won 75 of the 86 Muslim seats in the province and emerged as the biggest party, but failed to win any non-Muslim ones and fell short of the majority in the 175 seat assembly. The Muslim zamindar-led secular Unionist Party, which had won 18 seats, of whom 10 were Muslim, formed a coalition government with the Indian National Congress (which was the second biggest winner after the ML, winning 51 seats) and the Shiromani Akali Dal (which had won 20 seats, all from Sikh constituencies). The Unionist leader Khizar Hayat Tiwana was elected the premier.

After withdrawing from the Cabinet Mission plan in July 1946, Muslim League leader Muhammad Ali Jinnah called for “Direct Action” in August. The calls for direct action were followed by large-scale rioting and violence in Calcutta and elsewhere. In December 1947, rioting was reported from the North West Frontier Province (NWFP) after a Muslim League campaign to oust the Congress government in that province. The neighbouring Rawalpindi Division received thousands of Hindu and Sikh refugees who had been driven out from the Hazara district of NWFP. In January 1947, Tiwana banned the RSS and the Muslim League National Guard, which prompted large “direct action” demonstrations by the Muslim League throughout the province that later turned violent. The Muslim League campaign worsened communal tensions in the province, which had already been raised after previous year's election campaign. On 20 February 1947, British Prime Minister Clement Attlee announced that the British will leave India by June 1948.

Events

On 2 March 1947, Khizar Hayat Tiwana resigned as premier in light of the Muslim League agitations and campaign against his ministry, and the official announcement of the imminent end of British rule. Although anticipated, a Muslim League-led coalition could not form due to the League’s inability to assuage the fears of non-Muslim legislators, who had become increasingly hostile to the League and the demand for Pakistan. Communal clashes erupted in Lahore and Amritsar on 4 March after Hindus and Sikhs began demonstrations against the Pakistan demand. On 5 March, which marked the Hindu festival of Holi, armed Muslim mobs started attacking Hindus and Sikhs in several cities of West Punjab, including the cantonment town of Rawalpindi and Multan, killing close to 200 in the latter with the casualties being mostly Hindu. With no government in sight, Governor Evan Jenkins imposed governor’s rule in Punjab.

The rioting soon spread from the towns to the rural areas of Rawalpindi Division in northern Punjab. Faced with resistance from the Sikhs and Hindus in the divisional headquarters of Rawalpindi, Muslim mobs banded together and turned to the countryside. The mobs went on a rampage, engaging in arson, looting, massacres and rape, one village after the other in the districts of Rawalpindi, Jhelum and Cambellpur (present-day Attock). Sikhs were the primary targets, but Hindus were also attacked. In one incident, on 7 March, a train was raided by a mob at Taxila, which killed 22 Hindu and Sikh passengers. Houses in the Sikh and Hindu quarters of the village of Kahuta were torched with their occupants present inside, while women were abducted to be raped.

The village of Thoha Khalsa was the site of a much-publicised massacre. An armed Muslim mob laid siege to the village, asking the Sikh residents to convert to Islam. Sikh men killed female members of their families to prevent their abduction and rape, before being killed themselves by the attackers. More than 90 Sikh women and children committed mass suicide after jumping into a well to avoid rape. The death toll at the village is estimated to be around 300. A similar massacre, mass suicide and looting also took place at the village of Choa Khalsa, where around 150 Sikhs—and a smaller number of Hindus—were killed, and in the Sikh village of Dhamali. Some of the survivors had been left disfigured and mutilated, breasts of many women who had been raped were cut-off.

The attacks were premeditated, and rumours were spread through mosques to instigate Muslim villagers. The attackers are said to have received weapons and funds from outside, and were partly funded by the Muslim League. Houses of those driven out were razed and subsequently flattened up to prevent them from returning and rebuilding. The ancestral home of Tara Singh was also reduced to ashes. The mobs continued their campaign of loot and mass murder for two weeks without hindrance. While there is little evidence directly implicating the top leadership of the Muslim League—including Jinnah, no leaders of the Muslim League, national or provincial, offered any condemnation of the massacres.

Aftermath and Impact

The Rawalpindi massacres triggered a mass-migration of Sikhs and Hindus from the Rawalpindi Division to central and eastern Punjab, Sikh-ruled princely states, Jammu and Kashmir, Delhi and UP. The descriptions of atrocities faced by these refugees provoked feelings of revenge, especially among the Sikhs. The massacres had a deep impact on the Sikhs and Hindus of the Punjab, who planned to avenge them later by unleashing similar violence on the Muslims of the eastern portions of the province, to make way for the settlement of the refugees who had been driven out from the west. The Sikhs, in particular, felt especially humiliated as parts of the Muslim press taunted them after the massacres. The absence of condemnation of the massacres by leaders of the Muslim League widened the growing rift between the League and the Sikhs. The riots also lead to the Congress and Sikh leaders of the Punjab demanding its partition. On 8 March, the Congress Working Committee passed a resolution to partition the Punjab.

Notes

References

Bibliography

External links
 The partition of India and retributive genocide in the Punjab,1946–47: means, methods, and purposes  University of Washington
 Thematic Chronology of Mass Violence in Pakistan, 1947-2007:1947; March 3 massviolence.org
 

Partition of India
1947 in India
Rawalpindi District
Sectarian violence
History of Punjab
Ethnic cleansing in Asia
History of Rawalpindi